"Honey" is the fifth episode of the sixth season of the post-apocalyptic horror television series Fear the Walking Dead, which aired on AMC on November 8, 2020, in the United States.

Plot 
Dwight and Sherry spend the night and she begins to read the letters that she wrote to him. Dwight takes his last dose of medicine to combat the bubonic plague, then he receives a radio call from Hill who interrupts him, requesting that he return to Al with the tapes for Virginia, giving it a period of 48 hours. Sherry gets up and disappears, and he hears strange noises, prompting him to take his hatchet and investigate where she went. A masked individual is standing outside the front door and runs away, and suddenly more masked individuals capture him.

In a skatepark, Dwight is captive. Suddenly, the masked men appear. Dwight frees himself and holds one at gunpoint, threatening him where Sherry is. Suddenly, several men from above point their guns at Dwight, and Sherry appears and tells him that everything is okay, revealing that she is part of the masked men. Ozzie, a member of the masked men, threatens Dwight with killing Al, if he does not give him information about Virginia's whereabouts, but he honestly denies it. Rollie suddenly appears and requested from this, and they free Al. The group trusts Dwight and Sherry explains to him that her group is rebellious against the order of Virginia and that their objective is to shoot down the SWAT truck. Al explains that they cannot destroy the van and that it is better to steal it. The assault on the truck is successfully achieved with the unexpected help of Morgan.

The group meets at the skatepark and Morgan gives them information about a new community. Sherry explains to Morgan that she plans to kill Virginia to save the life of her group. Morgan refuses to participate, because he knows that there will be too many casualties, and that he had already lived this experience, referring to Negan. Dwight violently interrogates the captured pioneer using a wolf to attack him, but Morgan stops him. The next day, Dwight and Morgan discuss the plan to kill Virginia. Dwight hints that he does not intend to step back. Sherry convinces Dwight to give another report, and Dwight proceeds to meet Hill. Sherry locks up Dwight, Morgan, and Al to proceed with the attack on Virginia.

At night, Morgan convinces Dwight to stop Sherry. Dwight manages to get loose and the Virginia men arrive at the place. When they are about to attack, Dwight manages to get to where Sherry is and reluctantly convinces her. He manages to stop the attack by the men of Virginia. Later, Morgan and Al convince Dwight to go with them and he decides to accompany them outside the city center. Morgan introduces himself to the people in the center of the building. Morgan tells everyone that where they will go will require "a lot of work." Dwight leaves a clue for Sherry where she can locate him.

Reception 
David S.E. Zapanta from Den of Geek! rated the episode 3 out of 5, and wrote: "I wish I could say 'Honey' is as satisfying as the episodes that came before it, especially given the pedigreed talent behind the camera. Michael E. Satrazemis directed season 4's 'Laura' and 'Close Your Eyes' — which are among the show’s best. [...] Perhaps it all boils down to the Walking Dead universe itself being incapable of sustaining positive, long-lasting change, leaving viewers with a nagging sense of been there, done that." Paul Daily writing for TV Fanatic rated it 4.5 out of 5, writing: "The biggest compliment I can give 'Honey' is how well the simmering tension between different factions reached the boiling point." Emily Hannemann of TV Insider called it "Another good installment in a half-season where each episode has been extremely watchable. Whatever changes Fear made behind the scenes, at least thus far, it appears they’re working."

Ratings 
The episode was seen by 1.24 million viewers in the United States on its original air date, below the previous episodes.

References

External links

 "Honey" at AMC.com
 

2020 American television episodes
Fear the Walking Dead (season 6) episodes